William B. Johnson may refer to:

 William B. Johnson (mathematician) (born 1944), functional analyst and professor of mathematics at Ohio State University
 William Brooks Johnson (1763–1830), English physician and botanist
 William B. Johnson, president of the Illinois Central Railroad 1969–1972
 William Bullein Johnson (1782–1862), president of the Southern Baptist Convention, 1845–1851

See also
William Johnson (disambiguation)